In Pakistan, a tehsil is an administrative sub-division of a District.

Here is a list of all the tehsils by provinces:

 List of tehsils of Azad Kashmir
 List of tehsils of Balochistan
 List of tehsils of Gilgit-Baltistan
 List of tehsils of Khyber Pakhtunkhwa
 List of tehsils of Punjab, Pakistan
 List of tehsils of Sindh